Jagadevpur is a village in the Indian state of Telangana , and a Mandal in Siddipet district .

Geography
It is the fourth-largest  mandal of the Siddipet district. Jagadevpur is 70 km north of Hyderabad and 30 km each from Bhongir and the famous Yadagirigutta (Temple).

There are 28 villages under Jagadevpur mandal:

References

Villages in Medak district